Khvor (also Romanized as Khowr and Khūr) is a village in Khvor Rural District of the Central District of Khusf County, South Khorasan province, Iran. At the 2006 National Census, its population was 813 in 228 households, when it was in the former Khusf District of Birjand County. The following census in 2011 counted 665 people in 170 households.

The latest census in 2016 showed a population of 1,010 people in 175 households, by which time the district had been separated from the county and Khusf County established with two new districts. It was the largest village in its rural district.

References 

Khusf County

Populated places in South Khorasan Province

Populated places in Khusf County